Kasten is a surname. Notable people with the surname include:

Bob Kasten (born 1942), U.S. Republican politician
G. Randy Kasten, attorney and author
Jeremy Kasten, American filmmaker
Karl Kasten (1916–2010), painter-printmaker-educator in the San Francisco Bay Area
Kasten Antell (1845–1906), Finnish politician
Lloyd Kasten (1905–1999), American Hispanist, medievalist, lexicographer, and Lusophile
Sam Kasten, comic actor in Yiddish Theater
Stan Kasten (born 1952), president, and part-owner, of the Los Angeles Dodgers
Tim Kasten (born 1983), German international rugby union player

See also
Hoher Kasten, mountain in the Appenzell Alps, overlooking the Rhine in Eastern Switzerland
Kasten bei Böheimkirchen, town in the district of Sankt Pölten-Land in the Austrian state of Lower Austria
Kasten-brust armour, German form of plate armour from the first half of 15th century
Kaisten (disambiguation)